The men's javelin throw event at the 2006 Commonwealth Games was held on March 25.

Results

References
Results

Javelin
2006